The 1999 Honduran Supercup was held between winners of 1997–98 Honduran Liga Nacional (Motagua) and 1997 Honduran Cup (Platense).  It was the second attempt for the Selacios to obtain the crown, however, the Blues prevailed as champions.

Qualified teams

The game

References

Honduran Supercup
Supercup